Kendhoo (Dhivehi: ކެންދޫ) is one of the inhabited islands of Baa Atoll, Maldives. It is located in the northern part of the Baa Atoll.

History

Kendhoo is famous for its historical and cultural significance. It is said that the island was visited by the Arabian scholar, Abdul Barakaath Yoosuf al Barbary, also known as Thabreyzgefaanu, who is believed to have been responsible for introducing Islam to the Maldives in 1153. While he stayed on the island, he taught Islamic rituals to the islanders and offered daily prayers there. The place where he stood to offer the prayers was marked by building the house named after him.

This building is still there, but some parts of this place were reconstructed by the Thalabath-noor Quran class in 2017. They cleaned the place and gave the facility of praying like the past days, in the past days some others also have repaired some damages at that place. They all did their best not to change the actual design of the place.

Geography

Demography
It is the most populated island among Kendhoo constituency.

Economy
Traditionally, fishery, and thatch-making are the main occupations and major livelihoods of the people of Kendhoo.  A significant number of the island’s youth work in resorts.  In addition to this, there are people who do construction work and retail business.

Services
Kendhoo has electricity for 24 hours generated from a powerhouse with three generators. Recently an expansion project of the electricity service in the island was completed by installing a new generator set and replacing the panel board and the entire cable network installed in the island. The project was funded with RF1 million loan assistance from the Asian Development Bank.

The main issue facing the island is lack of a sewerage system. The residents of the island have raised this issue to the concerned authorities on several occasions. But as of today their concern has not been seriously addressed by the government.

Education

The island has a higher secondary school which teaches up to grade 10. In the school most of  the teachers are local teachers. In addition, the island has a pre-school which is run by an NGO, Kendhoo Zuvaanunge Gulhun.

Healthcare
There is a Health Centre on the island which opens for sixteen hours a day. Currently the centre has an expatriate doctor for general consultations. The Health centre has also laboratory that investigate the diseases. The island has also 2 pharmacy run by STO (State Trading Organaization) and a private party. In addition Kendhoo is very famous for traditional herbal medicine, people from different parts of the country and even from other countries visit for treatments.

Transport

Harbour
It also includes ,  pavement next to the quay wall and a  concrete block quay wall. The project also installed navigation lights and harbour lights for the new harbour. The project costs totalled MVR 29,294,992.10 of the government budget.

References

External links
http://baa.gov.mv/islands/kendhoo
Seacology Kindergarten Project on Kendhoo Seacology
Kendhoo
Baa Kendhoo, News and Current Affairs

Islands of the Maldives